The SPI 200 Futures contract is the benchmark equity index futures contract in Australia, based on the S&P/ASX 200 Index. It provides all the traditional benefits of equity index derivatives. The SPI 200 is ranked in the top 10 equity index contracts in Asia in terms of traded volume.

Quarterly and serial futures and options are available. March, June, September, December up to six quarter months ahead and serial months up to two non-financial quarter months ahead.

See also
Stock market index future

Derivatives (finance)
Futures markets
Finance in Australia